The High Grand Falls Hydroelectric Power Station, also High Grand Falls Dam, is a planned hydroelectric power station across the Tana River that harnesses the energy of the Kibuka Falls, in Kenya. The station is expected to be the most powerful hydroelectric energy source in Kenya.

Location
This location is downstream of the Seven Forks Scheme.

Overview
This development is part of the Lamu Port and Lamu-Southern Sudan-Ethiopia Transport Corridor project (LAPSSET). An estimated 4,500 families in Kitui and Tharaka Nithi counties, are expected to be displaced by the new dam. The dam is also expected to mitigate flooding in the coastal counties during the rainy season.

History
The idea to build this dam was conceived in 2009, during the Mwai Kibaki presidency. Following a tendering process, a British entity, GBM Engineering Consortium, based in London, was the only qualifier for the tender. GBM beat six other international construction firms, five of them Chinese. Once initiated, construction is expected to last six years.

Ownership
The consortium that is developing the dam and power station, will design, fund, build, own, operate and transfer the project, after recovering their investment, during 20 years of ownership, following commercial commissioning.

Construction costs
The estimated costs for the dam and power plant is estimated at US$2 billion (KSh200 billion).

Timetable
The dam and power station will be developed in phases. The second phase, with capacity of another  is expected online in 2032.

See also
 List of power stations in Kenya
 Energy in Kenya

References

External links
Approximate Location of  High Grand Falls Dam

Hydroelectric power stations in Kenya
Kitui County
Tharaka-Nithi County
Proposed hydroelectric power stations 
Proposed renewable energy power stations in Kenya